The Coombe Hill Assistants' Tournament was a professional golf tournament for assistant professionals played from 1951 to 1964.

History
The Coombe Hill Club had held a 36-hole tournament for southern assistants for a few years before 1951. However, in 1951 the P.G.A. cancelled the PGA Assistants' Championship, leading the Coombe Hill Golf Club to open up their tournament to all assistants, and extending the event from 36 to 72 holes. It was later decided that the Gor-Ray Cup at Hartsbourne Golf Club would become the official Assistants' Championship. The Coombe Hill Assistants' Tournament acted as one of the two qualifying events for the Championship.

In 1952 the event was not open to foreign assistants. The event acted as the sole qualifying event for the Gor-Ray Cup in 1952 and 1953. With the Gor-Ray Cup becoming a 72-hole stroke-play event in 1954 the Coombe Hill Assistants' Tournament used a format similar to that previously used for the Gor-Ray Cup. There was a 36 stroke-play qualification stage, after which the leading 16 played match-play. In the 1954 event, assistants who had finished fourth or higher in a PGA tournament were not eligible to play. The event reverted to 72-hole medal play in 1955.

Coombe Hill hosted the PGA Assistants' Championship in 1983, 1984, 1985 and 1987.

Winners 

The 1963 event was held at Selsdon Park Golf Club because of reconstruction work at Coombe Hill. Because of heavy rain on the first day, the tournament was reduced to 54 holes. The 1964 event was held at Hill Barn Golf Club, Worthing.

References

Golf tournaments in England